The Fiscal Court (abbreviated ) is a specialised German court with fiscal jurisdiction. Under German law, the Fiscal Court is the court of first instance for legal action in fiscal disputes.

The punishment of tax offenders is not one of the responsibilities of the Fiscal Courts. The Fiscal Courts are not an extended arm of the tax administration, but are legally independent like any other German court.

The structure of the German courts with fiscal jurisdiction is two-tiered. The appeals against decisions by the Fiscal Courts is heard by the Federal Fiscal Court.

List of the Fiscal Courts 
Germany has 18 Fiscal Courts and one Federal Fiscal Court. Every German state has one Fiscal Court except Berlin and Brandenburg, which have a shared Fiscal Court, Bavaria, which has two Fiscal Courts (in Munich and Nuremberg) and North Rhine-Westphalia, which has three Fiscal Courts (Düsseldorf, Cologne and Münster).

References

Bibliography

External links
Official homepage of the Federal Fiscal Court
Information in English about the Federal Fiscal Court

Administrative courts
Courts in Germany
Tax courts
Taxation in Germany